Rive Gauche is a women's perfume launched by Yves Saint Laurent in 1971. 

The fragrance was composed in 1969 by perfumers Jacques Polge and Michael Hy at Roure. It was reformulated  by Daniela Andrier and Jacques Hy at Givaudan in 2003. The all-aluminium silver and cobalt blue striped bottle was designed by Pierre Dinnand.
The perfume was named after Yves Saint Laurent's newly opened boutique in Saint-Germain-des-Prés, the first ready-to-wear store opened by a couturier.

Perfume critic Luca Turin considered Rive Gauche as the "best floral aldehydic of all time". It is a classic aldehyde with a floral heart and woody base notes.

References

Perfumes
Yves Saint Laurent (brand)
Products introduced in 1971